Arthrocereus is a genus of cactus, originating from southern Minas Gerais, Brazil.

Species
Species in the genus include:

References

 
Cacti of South America
Endemic flora of Brazil
Flora of Minas Gerais
Cactoideae genera
Taxa named by Alwin Berger